Agostino Bertelli (Brescia, 1727 - 1776)  was an Italian painter, mainly painting landscapes.

His father was a watch maker, but obtained a clerical education for his son. However, he became attached to music, as a violinist, and became an excellent landscape painter, training under Faustino Raineri. He was influenced by the works of Cavalier Tempesta, Berghem, and Piazeztta. He traveled to Genoa, where he befriended the painter of seascapes, Orazio Vernet.

After two years, he moved to Milan, where he was patronized by the Cardinal Giuseppe Pozzobonelli; who was a collector of the landscape artists Dietrich.

Upon returning to Brescia, his health was poor, and he had no reputation in that town. Among his pupils was the Count Aimo Maggi.

References

1727 births
1776 deaths
18th-century Italian painters
Italian male painters
Italian landscape painters
Painters from Brescia
18th-century Italian male artists